Carpenter Creek, Montana is a ghost town in Musselshell County.  It was the site of a Post Office from 1915–1918, with John Donovan as postmaster.  The site of a former large coal mine, Carpenter Creek is the birthplace of J. R. "Doc" Campbell, the 82nd Associate Justice of the Oregon Supreme Court.

References

Populated places in Musselshell County, Montana
Ghost towns in Montana